Frank Dauwen (born 3 November 1967) is a Belgian professional football coach and former player, who currently works as the assistant manager of Indian Super League club Kerala Blasters FC.

Playing career
Douwen, who played as a midfielder has made five appearances for the Belgium national team. He had a club career from 1985–2003 during which he won the Belgian Cup once. At the club level, he has played around in 340 matches.

References

External links
 

1967 births
Living people
Belgian footballers
Lierse S.K. players
K.A.A. Gent players
K.V.C. Westerlo players
Belgian Pro League players
Challenger Pro League players
Belgium international footballers
Association football midfielders
Belgian football managers
K.V.C. Westerlo managers
Belgian expatriate sportspeople in Saudi Arabia
People from Geel
Footballers from Antwerp Province
Kerala Blasters FC non-playing staff